Hasmik Yeremyan (born 15 September 1992) is an Armenian former footballer who played as a defender. She has been a member of the Armenia women's national team.

See also
List of Armenia women's international footballers

References

External links

1992 births
Living people
Women's association football defenders
Armenian women's footballers
Armenia women's international footballers